The Brecker Bros. Collection, Vol 1 is a compilation album by the American jazz fusion group, the Brecker Brothers. It was released by Novus Records in 1990. A second compilation, The Brecker Bros. Collection, Vol 2, was released in 1991.

Reception
AllMusic awarded the album with 4 stars and its review by Scott Yanow states: "There are some strong moments on the best-of disc, particularly the ballad "Dream Theme". The die-hard Brecker Brothers fans will prefer to get the complete sessions on the original LPs, but this makes a nice sampler for casual fans".

Track listing
 "Skunk Funk" (Randy Brecker) — 5:00
 "Sponge" (Randy Brecker) — 4:00
 "Squids" (Randy Brecker) — 7:45
 "Funky Sea, Funky Dew" (Michael Brecker) — 6:11
 "Inside Out" (Randy Brecker) — 9:27
 "Dream Theme" (Michael Brecker) — 5:37
 "I Don't Know Either" (Michael Brecker) — 5:47
 "Bathsheba" (Michael Brecker) — 7:00
 "Straphangin'" (Michael Brecker) — 8:05
 "Threesome" (Randy Brecker) — 6:21
 "East River" (Neil Jason, Bret Mazur, Kash Monet) — 3:33

Personnel
Randy Brecker – trumpet, flugelhorn
Michael Brecker – tenor saxophone
David Sanborn – alto saxophone
Don Grolnick – keyboards
Bob Mann – guitar
Will Lee – bass
Harvey Mason – drums
Ralph MacDonald – percussion
Doug Riley – keyboards
Steve Khan – guitar
Hiram Bullock – guitar
Steve Gadd – drums 
Chris Parker – drums
Barry Finnerty – guitar
Neil Jason – bass, lead vocal
Terry Bozzio – drums
Sammy Figueroa – percussion
Rafael Cruz – percussion
Jeff Mironov – guitar
David Spinozza – guitar
Marcus Miller – bass
George Duke – string synthesizer
Mark Gray – electric piano
Richie Morales – drums
Manolo Badrena – percussion
Paul Schaeffer – Fender Rhodes
Allan Schwartzberg – drums
Victoria – tambourine
Kash Monet – handclaps, percussion, backing vocals
Jeff Schoen – backing vocals
Roy Herring – backing vocals
Bob Clearmountain – handclaps

References

1990 compilation albums
Brecker Brothers albums
Albums produced by Michael Cuscuna